Anna Konkle (born April 7, 1987) is an American actress, writer and director. She is known for co-creating and starring as Anna Kone on Hulu's original TV comedy series PEN15, alongside Maya Erskine. Her work on the series earned her two Primetime Emmy Awards nominations for Outstanding Writing for a Comedy Series in 2019 and Outstanding Comedy Series in 2021.

Early life and education
Konkle was born in Randolph, Vermont, on April 7, 1987. In 1994, her family moved to Scituate, Massachusetts, where she attended public schools. Her parents divorced in her early teens, a theme she would explore deeply on PEN15.

Konkle attended New York University's Tisch School of the Arts. She initially studied musical theater but shifted to the school's Experimental Theater Wing after finding out she had vocal nodules. During her junior year at NYU, she attended an international experimental theater program in Amsterdam. There she met fellow student Maya Erskine, who would become her best friend and PEN15 co-creator.

Career
Konkle started her career working on student films while at the New York University and in experimental theater. During the first decade of her career, she appeared in small roles in TV shows such as New Girl, Shameless and Ramy. From 2015 to 2017, she appeared as Tara "TMI" Milly Izikoff on the main cast of Rosewood.

In 2019, Konkle co-created with Maya Erskine and Sam Zvibleman Hulu's original TV comedy series PEN15. Konkle and Erskine star as 13-year-old semi-fictional versions of themselves at an adult take on middle school. The show received critical acclaim and for her work, she earned two Primetime Emmy Awards nominations for Outstanding Writing for a Comedy Series in 2019 and Outstanding Comedy Series in 2021.

Personal life
In early 2021, Konkle confirmed she welcomed her first daughter, Essie Wunderle Anfanger, with partner Alex Anfanger.

Filmography

References

External links
 
 

Living people
American television actresses
1987 births
21st-century American actresses
People from Randolph, Vermont
Actresses from Vermont
People from Scituate, Massachusetts
Actresses from Massachusetts
Screenwriters from Vermont
Screenwriters from Massachusetts
21st-century American women writers
21st-century American screenwriters
New York University alumni